Melvin Abdul Noble Jr  (May 31, 1992 – November 11, 2020), better known by his stage name MO3, was an American rapper and singer best known for his 2019 collaboration "Errybody" with Boosie Badazz. His joint album with longtime associate Boosie Badazz (BadAzz Mo3) peaked at number 136 on the US Billboard 200. His posthumous album Shottaz 4Eva reached number 36 on the US Billboard 200 in April 2021, while his single "Outside" debuted at number 16 on the US Bubbling Under Hot 100 the same week, later reaching number 92 on the Billboard Hot 100.

Early life and career 
MO3 was born in McKinney, Texas. Later on he moved to North Dallas, where he would be raised. His debut mixtape, Shottaz, was released in 2014. The same year, Mo3 released his single Hold Ya Tongue a remix of infamous Texas rapper Mr. Lucci and resulted in him gaining buzz throughout the region. In 2016 Mo3 released Shottaz Reloaded a project with numerous hits that gain the attention of Boosie Badazz who at the time wanted to sign the artist.

Death 
Noble was shot and killed on November 11, 2020, at the age of 28. While being pursued by another vehicle as he was driving on Interstate 35 in Dallas, he stopped the car in front of a semi on the center lane. Kewon Dontrell White stopped his car as well and approached Noble while he was in the car. Noble tried to retrieve a weapon but was unable to and ran south on the highway. White chased him and shot Noble multiple times with a rifle before returning to his dark-colored vehicle. White fled in the car, believed to be a 2015 Chevrolet Camaro. Noble was transported to a local hospital where he was pronounced dead.

Two suspects were arrested for his murder: the gunman Kewon Dontrell White on December 9, 2020, and Devin Maurice Brown on April 23, 2021. Noble was the father of three children.

Discography

Studio albums

Mixtapes

Singles 
 "Outside" (2021) – No. 92 US Billboard Hot 100

Record labels 
 Hit Sqwadd Muzik
Empire Distribution
 Boosie Badazz's Bad Azz
Create Music Group

See also 
List of murdered hip hop musicians

References

External links 
Mo3 discography at Discogs

1992 births
2020 deaths
21st-century American rappers
African-American rappers
Rappers from Dallas
Deaths by firearm in Texas
21st-century African-American musicians